The Chinese Ambassador to Greece is the official representative of the People's Republic of China to Greece.

List of representatives

Republic of China

People's Republic of China

See also
China–Greece relations

References 

Ambassadors of China to Greece
Greece
China